is a Chinese characters meaning "blessing mountain(s)". It may refer to:

 Fushan (disambiguation), the Chinese transliteration
 Fukuyama (disambiguation), the Japanese transliteration